Lauren Bell (born 1999) is a British and Scottish female track cyclist.

Cycling career
Bell became a double British champion when winning the time trial Championship and the keirin championship at the 2020 British National Track Championships. She went on to take her first global medal with a bronze in the team sprint at the 2022 UCI Track Cycling World Championships.

References

1999 births
Living people
British female cyclists
British track cyclists
Scottish track cyclists
Cyclists at the 2022 Commonwealth Games
Commonwealth Games competitors for Scotland
21st-century British women